Aechmea drakeana is a plant species in the genus Aechmea. This species is native to Ecuador and Peru.

References

drakeana
Flora of Ecuador
Flora of Peru
Plants described in 1888